The Bad Man of Brimstone is a 1937 American Western film directed by J. Walter Ruben and starring Wallace Beery, Virginia Bruce and Dennis O'Keefe. The screenplay was written by Cyril Hume and Richard Maibaum, from a story by Ruben and Maurice Rapf. 

The film was shot in parts of Utah, including Johnson Canyon, the Gap, Kanab Canyon, Zion National Park, and Springdale.

Plot
In 1889 at a saloon in the town of Brimstone, AZ, "Trigger Bill" (a western outlaw) recognizes a young boxer ("Jeff") to be his long-lost son.  After reconciling, Bill steers Jeff away from a boxing career and sends him to law school. When his son returns, a lot has changed.

Cast
 Wallace Beery as "Trigger" Bill
 Virginia Bruce as Loretta Douglas
 Dennis O'Keefe as Jeff Burton
 Joseph Calleia as Ben
 Lewis Stone as Mr. Jackson Douglas
 Guy Kibbee as "Eight Ball" Harrison
 Bruce Cabot as "Blackjack" McCreedy
 Cliff Edwards as "Buzz" McCreedy
 Guinn "Big Boy" Williams as "Vulch" McCreedy (as Guinn Williams)
 Arthur Hohl as "Doc" Laramie

 John Qualen as 'Loco'
 Charley Grapewin as Barney Lane
 Robert Barrat as "Hank" Summers
 Noah Beery as Ambrose Crocker

References

External links
 
 
 
 

1937 films
1930s English-language films
1937 Western (genre) films
Films directed by J. Walter Ruben
American black-and-white films
Metro-Goldwyn-Mayer films
American Western (genre) films
Films produced by Harry Rapf
Films shot in Utah
Films with screenplays by Richard Maibaum
1930s American films
Films with screenplays by Maurice Rapf